Sundbyholm Castle is a castle near the town of Eskilstuna, Sweden on the southern shore of Lake Mälaren.

History
Sundbyholm Castle was built by the Admiral of the Navy Carl Gyllenhielm, son of King Charles IX of Sweden.

Sundbyholm Castle is known for the beauty of its grounds and nearby environs. It has been the subject of several paintings and drawings, the most famous of which is "The Old Castle" by Prince Eugen, Duke of Närke.

In 1975, the Swedish Bandy Association observed its 50th anniversary here.

See also
List of castles in Sweden

References

External links 

Castles in Södermanland County